Zdzisław Julian Bieniek (9 May 1930 – 21 December 2017) was a Polish footballer who competed in the 1952 Summer Olympics.

References

1930 births
2017 deaths
Poland international footballers
Association football midfielders
Footballers from Kraków
Polish footballers
Olympic footballers of Poland
Footballers at the 1952 Summer Olympics
Legia Warsaw players